Bucklen Theatre, also known as the Elkhart Opera House, was a historic theatre located at Elkhart, Elkhart County, Indiana.  It was built in 1883, and was a three-story, five bay, red brick building.  It was demolished in 1986.

It was added to the National Register of Historic Places in 1976 and delisted in 1986.

References

Former National Register of Historic Places in Indiana
Theatres on the National Register of Historic Places in Indiana
Theatres completed in 1883
Buildings and structures in Elkhart, Indiana
National Register of Historic Places in Elkhart County, Indiana
Demolished buildings and structures in Indiana
Buildings and structures demolished in 1986